Arum maculatum is a woodland flowering plant species in the family Araceae. It is native across most of Europe, as well as Turkey and the Caucasus.

Description
The leaves of A. maculatum appear in the spring (April–May in the northern hemisphere, October–November in the southern hemisphere) and are 7 to 20 cm long. These are followed by the flowers borne on a poker-shaped inflorescence called a spadix, which is partially enclosed in a pale green spathe or leaf-like hood. The spathe can be up to 25 cm high and the fruiting spike which follows later in the season may be up to 5 cm. The flowers are hidden from sight, clustered at the base of the spadix with a ring of female flowers at the bottom and a ring of male flowers above them. The leaves may be either purple-spotted (var. maculatum) or unspotted (var. immaculatum).

Above the male flowers is a ring of hairs forming an insect trap. Insects, especially owl-midges Psychoda phalaenoides, are attracted to the spadix by its faecal odour and a temperature up to 15 °C warmer than the ambient temperature. The insects are trapped beneath the ring of hairs and are dusted with pollen by the male flowers before escaping and carrying the pollen to the spadices of other plants, where they pollinate the female flowers. The spadix may also be yellow, but purple is the more common.

In autumn, the lower ring of (female) flowers forms a cluster of bright red, berries  up to 5 cm long which remain after the spathe and other leaves have withered away. These attractive red to orange berries are extremely poisonous.

The root-tuber may be very big and is used to store starch. In mature specimens, the tuber may be as much as 400 mm below ground level.

Many small rodents appear to find the spadix particularly attractive; finding examples of the plant with much of the spadix eaten away is common. The spadix produces heat and probably scent as the flowers mature, and this may attract the rodents.

Arum maculatum is also known as cuckoo pint or cuckoo-pint in the British Isles and is named thus in Nicholas Culpepers' famous 17th-century herbal. This is a name it shares with Arum italicum (Italian lords-and-ladies) - the other native British Arum. "Pint" is a shortening of the word "pintle", meaning penis, derived from the shape of the spadix. The euphemistic shortening has been traced to Turner in 1551.

The plant is propagated by birds dispersing the seeds by eating the berries. As a seedling the plant has small light green leaves that are not glossy like the mature leaves. At about 5 months its leaves grow larger and glossier. At one year old all of the leaves become glossy and die back. The next year the plant flowers during summer.

Common names
A. maculatum is known by an abundance of common names including Adam and Eve, adder's meat, adder's root, arum, wild arum, arum lily, bobbins, cows and bulls, cuckoopint, cuckoo-plant, devils and angels, friar's cowl, jack in the pulpit, lamb-in-a-pulpit, lords-and-ladies, naked boys, snakeshead, starch-root, and wake-robin. Many names refer to the plant's appearance; "lords-and-ladies" and many other names liken the plant to male and female genitalia symbolising copulation. Starch-root is a simple description – the plant's root was used to make laundry starch.

Distribution and habitat
It grows in woodland areas and riversides. It can occasionally grow as a weed in partly shaded spots.

Taxonomy
A. maculatum is the type species of the genus Arum.
Within the genus, it belongs to subgenus Arum, section Arum.

A. maculatum has a chromosome count of 2n = 56.

Toxicity
All parts of the plant can produce allergic reactions in many people and the plant should be handled with care.

The attractive berries are extremely poisonous to many animals, including humans, but harmless to birds, which eat them and propagate the seeds. They contain oxalates of saponins which have needle-shaped crystals that irritate the skin, mouth, tongue, and throat, and result in swelling of throat, difficulty breathing, burning pain, and upset stomach. However, their acrid taste, coupled with the almost immediate tingling sensation in the mouth when consumed, means that large amounts are rarely taken and serious harm is unusual. It is one of the most common causes of accidental plant poisoning based on attendance at hospital emergency departments.

There is no known antidote to A. maculatum poisoning. Airway management may reduce the mortality, and aggressive fluid administration may prevent renal injury.

Uses

Culinary
The root of the cuckoo-pint, when roasted well, is edible and when ground was once traded under the name of Portland sago. It was used like salep (orchid flour) to make saloop, a drink popular before the introduction of tea or coffee.  It was also used as a substitute for arrowroot.  It can be highly toxic if not prepared correctly.

The leaves, which are toxic, can be mistaken for edible sorrel.

Arum maculatum is also used to make soup in the Andırın region of Turkey where the leaves are leavened with yogurt and boiled for long hours which eliminates toxicity. This process results in a sour soup which is called Tirşik.

Cultivated
Arum maculatum is cultivated as an ornamental plant in traditional and woodland shade gardens. The cluster of bright red berries standing alone without foliage can be a striking landscape accent. The mottled and variegated leaf patterns can add bright interest in darker habitats.

Arum maculatum may hybridize with Arum italicum.

Laundry starch
The roots were a traditional source of starch for stiffening clothes. In 1440, the nuns of Syon Abbey in England used the roots of the cuckoo-pint flower to make starch for church linens; only starch "made of herbes" could be used for communion linen.

References

External links

 Nature's Secret Larder

maculatum
Medicinal plants of Europe
Garden plants of Europe
Flora of Europe
Poisonous plants
Plant toxins
Neurotoxins
Plants described in 1753
Taxa named by Carl Linnaeus